Ilocos Norte's at-large congressional district is an obsolete electoral district that was used for electing members of Philippine national legislatures in Ilocos Norte before 1987.

Ilocos Norte first elected its representatives at-large during the 1898 Philippine legislative election for six seats in the Malolos Congress, the National Assembly of the First Philippine Republic. Following the installation of U.S. civil government in 1901 and the reorganization of provinces for the Philippine Assembly, Ilocos Norte was divided into a first and second district. The provincewide district was re-created ahead of the 1943 Philippine legislative election for a seat in the National Assembly of the Second Philippine Republic, with an additional seat assigned to its provincial governor. The district became inactive again following the restoration of the House of Representatives in 1945 when Ilocos Norte returned to electing its representatives from its two districts. In the unicameral Batasang Pambansa that replaced the House in 1978, Ilocos Norte was included in the multi-member regional electoral district of Region I (Ilocos Region) for its interim parliament. The district was again utilized in the 1984 Philippine parliamentary election when Ilocos Norte was granted two seats in the regular parliament.

After 1986, Ilocos Norte elected its representatives from its two single-member congressional districts restored under a new constitution.

Representation history

See also
Legislative districts of Ilocos Norte

References

Former congressional districts of the Philippines
Politics of Ilocos Norte
1898 establishments in the Philippines
1901 disestablishments in the Philippines
1943 establishments in the Philippines
1944 disestablishments in the Philippines
1984 establishments in the Philippines
1986 disestablishments in the Philippines
At-large congressional districts of the Philippines
Congressional districts of the Ilocos Region
Constituencies established in 1898
Constituencies disestablished in 1901
Constituencies established in 1943
Constituencies disestablished in 1944
Constituencies established in 1984
Constituencies disestablished in 1986